Melanonotus is a genus of katydid insects in the family Tettigoniidae.

Species

References 

Pseudophyllinae
Orthoptera of North America
Orthoptera of South America
Tettigoniidae genera